Luisa Micheletti (born June 23, 1983) is a presenter on MTV Brasil. She is from an Italian-Brazilian family. In the past she has also done other television presenting work.

External links
Page on MTV Brasil (Portuguese)
 Luisa Micheletti on Myspace

Brazilian people of Italian descent
Brazilian television presenters
Brazilian women television presenters
VJs (media personalities)
1983 births
Living people